Song Chen (Chinese: 宋琛; born 3 January 1990 in Dalian) is a Chinese football player who currently plays for China League One side Sichuan Jiuniu.

Club career
Song Chen would start his football career playing for the various Dalian Shide F.C. youth teams before he was sent out to the team's reserve team called Dalian Shide Siwu FC that was allowed to take part in Singapore's 2008 S.League. He would make his debut on 21 February 2008 in a league game against Home United that ended in a 2-1 defeat. He would return to the Dalian Shide's youth team as they participated in the 2009 National Games of China. He would go on to transfer to Chinese Super League team Shenzhen Ruby in 2010 along with fellow teammate Quan Heng. He would eventually make his league debut for Shenzhen on 2 May 2010 in a game against Henan Jianye, coming on as a substitute for Yuan Lin in the 43rd minute. Song would gradually start to establish himself within the team until the introduction of new Head coach Philippe Troussier, who did not integrate Song into his tactical system. 

In February 2012, he transferred to Chinese Super League side Liaoning Whowin. In February 2013, Song moved to China League Two side Qinghai Senke on a one-year loan deal. On his return he gradually started to become a regular within the team, but was also part of the squad that saw the club relegated at the end of the 2017 Chinese Super League campaign. He left the club after they were dissolved on 23 May 2020 due to wage arrears. He would join another second tier club in Sichuan Jiuniu, on a free transfer and would make his debut in a league game against Kunshan FC on 13 September 2020 in a 2-0 defeat.

Career statistics 
Statistics accurate as of match played 31 December 2020.

References

External links
 

1990 births
Living people
Chinese footballers
Footballers from Dalian
Shenzhen F.C. players
Liaoning F.C. players
Sichuan Jiuniu F.C. players
China League Two players
China League One players
Chinese Super League players
Association football defenders